Farrukh Javed is a Pakistani politician who was a Member of the Provincial Assembly of the Punjab, from 2002 to May 2018.

Early life and education
He was born on 6 June 1958 in Arifwala.

He has a degree of Bachelor of Medicine and Bachelor of Surgery which he obtained in 1985 from Nishtar Medical College.

Political career
He was elected to the Provincial Assembly of the Punjab as a candidate of Pakistan Muslim League (Q) from Constituency PP-230 (Pakpattan-IV) in 2002 Pakistani general election.

He was re-elected to the Provincial Assembly of the Punjab  as a candidate of Pakistan Muslim League (N) (PML-N) from Constituency PP-230 (Pakpattan-IV) in 2008 Pakistani general election.

He was re-elected to the Provincial Assembly of the Punjab as a candidate of PML-N from Constituency PP-230 (Pakpattan-IV) in 2013 Pakistani general election. In June 2013, he was inducted into the provincial cabinet of Chief Minister Shahbaz Sharif and was made Provincial Minister of Punjab for Agriculture. He remained Minister for Agriculture until the cabinet reshuffle in November 2016, when he was made Provincial Minister of Punjab for literacy and non-formal education.

References

Living people
Punjab MPAs 2013–2018
1958 births
Pakistan Muslim League (N) politicians
Punjab MPAs 2002–2007
Punjab MPAs 2008–2013